The Dlamini King Brothers are an isicathamiya choir from the Kennedy Road shack settlement in Durban, South Africa. They were formed in 1999 and have won several awards. In January 2009 they released their début album Hlis’uMoya which contains a mixture of religious and political songs. They often perform at events organised by the squatter's movement Abahlali baseMjondolo and have written songs for the group.

References

External links
 Photographs of the Dlamini King Brothers performing at the Time of the Writer Festival, Durban, March 2009
 Music video
Abahlali by the Dlamini King Brothers

South African musical groups
Abahlali baseMjondolo members
Isicathamiya choirs
Culture of Durban
Musical groups established in 1999
1999 establishments in South Africa